Battleford (2011 population 4,065) is a small town located across the North Saskatchewan River from the City of North Battleford, in Saskatchewan, Canada.

Battleford and North Battleford are collectively referred to as "The Battlefords" by Saskatchewan residents, as well as on highway signage. Although there has been occasional talk of the two communities merging, as of 2023 they remain separate entities. The local economy is fuelled mainly by agriculture. Battleford is bordered by the Rural Municipality of Battle River No. 438, as well as by the city of North Battleford and a small section of the Rural Municipality of North Battleford No. 437.

The 1973 western Alien Thunder was partially filmed in Battleford.

History

The Battleford area was the site of numerous independent and Hudson's Bay Company fur trading houses dating from the 1770s. William Holmes operated a post for the North West Company just above the confluence of the Battle and Saskatchewan rivers in 1784. At least three posts were in use between 1868 and 1914. The town was founded in 1875 as a fur trading post and North-West Mounted Police (NWMP) fort. Its post office opened in 1877. Between 1876 and 1883, Battleford was the territorial capital of the North-West Territories (now Alberta, Saskatchewan, Nunavut, northern Quebec, northern Ontario and the Northwest Territories) and the NWMP fort (Fort Battleford) located there played an important role in the 1885 North-West Rebellion.  It is also the terminus of the historic Swift Current-Battleford Trail.

Looting of Battleford
  

On March 30, 1885, during the North-West Rebellion, the town of Battleford was looted by a party of Cree people, who were short on food due to declining bison populations. When the Cree approached Battleford, the 500 residents fled to the nearby North-West Mounted Police post, Fort Battleford.  The Crees then took food and supplies from the abandoned stores and houses.

Demographics 

Historic buildings

National historic sites in Battleford include Fort Battleford National Historic Site of Canada, Battleford Court House National Historic Site of Canada and Old Government House / Saint-Charles Scholasticate National Historic Site of Canada. The Old Government House, built in 1878–1879, was destroyed by fire in 2003 and was the seat of Territorial Government from 1878 to 1883

The Battleford Land Registry Office built between 1877 and 1878 is the last remaining building on Battleford's Government Ridge that dates from the Territorial era.
Other heritage buildings include the District Court House, the Town Hall / Opera House, the Former Land Titles Building, the Station Building, the Fred Light Museum (St. Vital School), St. Vital Church, Gardiner Church and the Former Bank of Montreal Building.

Local media
Newspaper
The local newspaper is The Battlefords News Optimist. It is published weekly on Wednesdays and Fridays, and has circulation in the surrounding area.

Radio
Three local radio stations serve the area; CJNB, CJCQ-FM ("Q98"), and CJHD-FM ("93.3 The Rock"). Some Saskatoon radio stations can also be received.

Television
The Battlefords are served by CFQC-TV-2 channel 6, an analogue repeater of CTV station CFQC-DT Saskatoon.

See also 
 List of communities in Saskatchewan
 List of towns in Saskatchewan
 Battleford Industrial School

References

Towns in Saskatchewan
Hudson's Bay Company trading posts
Division No. 12, Saskatchewan